S/S may refer to:

 A Ship prefix that identifies a vessel as steam powered Vessel
 A common naming prefix for any Merchant vessel
 S/S, an industry abbreviation in the fashion industry for Spring/Summer (as opposed to A/W (Autumn/Winter))
 S/S, a medical abbreviation for Signs and symptoms
 In clothing, refers to short-sleeved (as opposed to L/S (long-sleeved))
 Solidification / Stabilization (S/S) with Cement, a method of management and reuse of contaminated waste.

See also 
 SS (disambiguation)